During the 1996–97 English football season, Brentford competed in the Football League Second Division. Despite having led the division for most of the season, a collapse in the final 13 matches dropped the Bees into the playoffs, where they were defeated by Crewe Alexandra in the 1997 Second Division playoff Final.

Season summary
Despite a hangover in the 1995–96 season, Brentford entered 1996–97 with largely the same core of players which reached the 1995 Second Division playoff semi-finals. That said, central defender Barry Ashby and midfielders Paul Smith and Carl Hutchings all rejected new contracts in favour of monthly agreements, but the trio signed new deals during the opening two months of the season. Manager David Webb's only significant signing of the 1996 off-season was that of midfielder Scott Canham, paying West Ham United a £25,000 fee to turn his loan from the previous season into a permanent deal.

Brentford began the Second Division season with an 11-match unbeaten run and firmly held on to top spot in the table. The four-pronged attack of Carl Asaba, Nicky Forster, Robert Taylor and Marcus Bent proved fruitful and Asaba's 7-minute hat-trick versus Shrewsbury Town on 31 August 1996 was the quickest ever in a league match by a Brentford player. One win in eight matches from mid-October through to mid-November dropped the Bees back into the playoff positions, but the club returned to the summit early in the following 13-match unbeaten run. Forward Nicky Forster, who was in the final year of his contract, was sold to Birmingham City for a £700,000 fee on 31 January 1997, but he was not replaced.

Despite the loss of Forster, the unbeaten run continued until defeat away to Preston North End on 8 March. In the aftermath of the match, manager David Webb tendered his resignation, citing verbal abuse of himself, the coaching staff and the players and "undisclosed sensitive issues" as the reason. Chairman Martin Lange refused to accept Webb's resignation. The fallout from the Preston match gave way to a run of eight defeats in the final 13 matches of the season, in which just six goals were scored and the team failed to find the net at all during the final four matches. Things went from bad to worse when central defender Barry Ashby suffered an injury on 19 April and Carl Asaba was sent off in the penultimate match of the season. The run dropped Brentford from 1st to 4th place and into a two-legged tie with Bristol City in the playoff semi-finals.

Brentford rallied in the playoff semi-finals, seeing off Bristol City (who had finished the regular season with five consecutive wins) 4–2 on aggregate, winning 2–1 home and away. The Bees were "exposed and outclassed" in the final at Wembley Stadium versus Crewe Alexandra, losing 1–0 in a match which saw the Railwaymen hit the woodwork on three occasions and have two goalbound efforts cleared off the line by Carl Hutchings. In addition, Bees defender Brian Statham was sent off for committing a second bookable offence 15 minutes from time.

League table

Results
Brentford's goal tally listed first.

Legend

Pre-season and friendlies

Football League Second Division

Football League Second Division play-offs

FA Cup

League Cup

Football League Trophy

 Source: Statto, The Big Brentford Book of the Nineties

Playing squad 
Players' ages are as of the opening day of the 1996–97 season.

 Source: Soccerbase

Coaching staff

Statistics

Appearances and goals
Substitute appearances in brackets.

 Players listed in italics left the club mid-season.
 Source: The Big Brentford Book of the Nineties

Goalscorers 

 Players listed in italics left the club mid-season.
 Source: The Big Brentford Book of the Nineties

Discipline

 Players listed in italics left the club mid-season.
 Source: Soccerbase

Management

Summary

Transfers & loans

Kit

|
|
|

Awards 
 Supporters' Player of the Year: Barry Ashby
 Star Player of the Year: Barry Ashby
 London Evening Standard Player of the Month: Jamie Bates (December 1996)
 Ericsson Player of the Month: Kevin Dennis (April 1997)
 Football League Second Division Manager of the Month: David Webb (August 1996)

Notes

References

Brentford F.C. seasons
Brentford